is a Japanese former professional football player and manager. He played for Japan national team.

A defender, Ihara was captain of the Japan national team for more than a decade in the 1990s, together with striker Kazuyoshi Miura and Brazilian-born midfielder Ruy Ramos. Ihara's long standing record of 122 national team appearances was bested by Yasuhito Endo on October 16, 2012

Club career
Ihara was rarely out of the spotlight in the emerging J1 League throughout the 1990s. He spent most of his career with Yokohama F. Marinos and formed a key defensive partnership with the flamboyant Tsuyoshi Kitazawa at club level. After graduating from University of Tsukuba, he joined Nissan Motors (later Yokohama Marinos) and rapidly rose through the Marinos youth ranks to become a key player. The long-serving Ihara was so important to his club that he was nicknamed Mister Marinos by many Japanese fans. He formed the backbone of the club and also helped to bring on talented youngsters like Yoshikatsu Kawaguchi and Shunsuke Nakamura.

After leaving Marinos, Ihara also spent a season with Júbilo Iwata (2000) and his last two seasons with Urawa Reds (2001–2002). He retired in 2002. He played 341 games and scored 7 goals in the league. He was selected Best Eleven for six years in a row (1991–92 to 1997)

International career
On January 27, 1988, when Ihara was a University of Tsukuba student, he debuted for Japan national team against United Arab Emirates. After his debut, he became a regular player playing the 1990 FIFA World Cup qualification and at the 1990 Asian Games. In 1992, Japan won the AFC Asian Cup for the first time. However, at 1994 FIFA World Cup qualification, Japan failed to won for qualify to 1994 FIFA World Cup. After that, Ihara became a captain for Japan and played at 1995 King Fahd Cup and 1996 AFC Asian Cup. In 1997, at 1998 World Cup qualification, Japan achieved qualification for the 1998 FIFA World Cup for the first time. During the 1998 World Cup in France, the veteran sweeper's experience was crucial to Japan's survival in their very first World Cup appearance, forming a flat back three defence with strong centre-back Yutaka Akita as well as speedy fullbacks Eisuke Nakanishi (or strong centre-back Norio Omura). Young Marinos goalkeeper, Yoshikatsu Kawaguchi was Japan's first choice goalkeeper at the time. After 1998 World Cup, he played at 1999 Copa América. This competition was his last game for Japan. He played 122 games and scored 5 goals for Japan until 1999.

Coaching career
In 2006, Ihara became the assistant coach for the Japan U-23 national team and spent two years.

He then became the assistant coach for club Kashiwa Reysol in 2009, being the caretaker on two occasions.

After a horrible three years of being at the bottom half of the table in the J2 League, Avispa Fukuoka then hired Ihara as their coach, replacing the former Marijan Pušnik. Under Ihara, then club went on to win 24 games out of 42 and collected a total of 82 points, ending their regular season in third place. Avispa then went on to the playoffs, where they beat V-Varen Nagasaki 1–0, and then drew 1–1 against Cerezo Osaka. Avispa eventually ended up getting promoted to the J1 League as they were the higher-seeded team.

Ihara's first match in charge of Avispa in the 2016 J1 League was a 2–1 away loss against Sagan Tosu. The first win in the league was on their eighth match in a 1–0 away win in Tokyo against FC Tokyo.

He resigned end of 2018 season.

Career statistics

Club

International

Scores and results list Japan's goal tally first, score column indicates score after each Ihara goal.

Managerial statistics

Honours
Nissan Motors
 Emperor's Cup: 1991, 1992
 J1 League: 1995
 Asian Cup Winners' Cup: 1991–92, 1992–93

Júbilo Iwata
 Japanese Super Cup: 2000

Japan
 AFC Asian Cup: 1992

Individual
 Asian Footballer of the Year: 1995
 J.League Best XI: 1993, 1994, 1995, 1996, 1997
 J.League 20th Anniversary Team

See also
List of footballers with 100 or more caps

Notes

References

External links
 
 
 Japan National Football Team Database
 
 
 
 Hall of Fame

1967 births
Living people
University of Tsukuba alumni
Association football people from Shiga Prefecture
Japanese footballers
Japan international footballers
Japan Soccer League players
J1 League players
Yokohama F. Marinos players
Júbilo Iwata players
Urawa Red Diamonds players
1988 AFC Asian Cup players
1992 AFC Asian Cup players
1996 AFC Asian Cup players
Footballers at the 1990 Asian Games
1995 King Fahd Cup players
1998 FIFA World Cup players
1999 Copa América players
AFC Asian Cup-winning players
FIFA Century Club
Asian Footballer of the Year winners
Japanese football managers
J1 League managers
J2 League managers
Kashiwa Reysol managers
Avispa Fukuoka managers
Association football defenders
Asian Games competitors for Japan
Footballers at the 1994 Asian Games
Academic staff of Biwako Seikei Sport College
Presidents of the Japan Pro-Footballers Association